"Blue Moon of Kentucky" is a waltz written in 1945 by bluegrass musician Bill Monroe and recorded by his band, the Blue Grass Boys. The song has since been recorded by many artists, including Elvis Presley and Paul McCartney. "Blue Moon of Kentucky" is the official bluegrass song of Kentucky.

In 2002, Monroe's version was one of 50 recordings chosen that year by the Library of Congress to be added to the National Recording Registry. In 2003, CMT ranked "Blue Moon" number 11 in its list of 100 Greatest Songs in Country Music.

Bill Monroe version
Monroe's earliest-known performance of "Blue Moon of Kentucky" was on the Grand Ole Opry broadcast of August 25, 1945. He first recorded  it for Columbia Records on September 16, 1946, at The Wrigley Building in Chicago, Illinois. That recording was released in early 1947.  At the time, the Bluegrass Boys included vocalist and guitarist Lester Flatt and banjoist Earl Scruggs, who later formed their own bluegrass band, the Foggy Mountain Boys. Both Flatt and Scruggs performed on the recording, although Bill Monroe supplied the vocals on this song.

The song, described as a "bluegrass waltz", had become a United States wide hit by 1947 and also became enormously popular with other bluegrass, country, and early rockabilly acts. The song was revered at the Grand Ole Opry and others; Carl Perkins played an uptempo version of this song in his early live performances.

After Presley's more rock-oriented version became popular, Monroe tweaked the "Blue Grass Boys’ arrangement of it, starting it slowly, playing one round, and then jumping into a 4/4 time signature, as Presley had done, turning it into a barn-burning bluegrass classic".

Elvis Presley version

The search for another song to release along with "That's All Right" at Sun Records in July 1954 led to "Blue Moon of Kentucky" via Bill Black. Presley's version turned "it from a waltz to a bluesy rocker".

According to Scotty Moore:

Presley, Moore, and Black, with the encouragement of Sam Phillips, transformed Monroe's slow waltz, in  time, into an upbeat, blues-flavored tune in  time.

After an early rendition of the song, Sun Records owner Sam Phillips exclaimed, "BOY, that's fine, that's fine. That's a POP song now!" As with all of the Presley records issued by Sun, the artists were listed and stylized as "ELVIS PRESLEY SCOTTY and BILL".

The same night that Dewey Phillips first played the flip side of this first release of Presley's music on WHBQ, "That's All Right", Sleepy Eye John at WHHM loosed "Blue Moon of Kentucky". Bob Neal of WMPS played the record, too. The pop jockeys, entranced by something new, began slipping "That's All Right" and "Blue Moon of Kentucky" in among the easy-listening pop of Teresa Brewer, Nat Cole, Tony Bennett, and others.

With Presley's version of Monroe's song consistently rated higher, both sides began to chart across the Southern United States. Billboard has the song listed only in Memphis, and as number six with "That's All Right" at number 7 on October 9 in the C&W Territorial Best Sellers. By October 23, "Blue Moon" was in the top 10 in Memphis, Nashville, and New Orleans, with "That's All Right" absent from the listings.

Fellow Sun Records artist Charlie Feathers has often claimed that he came up with the arrangement of the song used by Presley. While others sources claimed that it was Presley who arranged the song. Monroe, at first, did not care for Presley's version until "powerful checks" (in sizeable amounts) began rolling in for Monroe's writing credit.

The song was later used in a scene of the 2005 TV miniseries Elvis.

Personnel
 Elvis Presley – lead vocals, acoustic rhythm guitar
 Scotty Moore – electric lead guitar
 Bill Black – double bass

Other recordings
In 1954, the Stanley Brothers recorded a version of the song using Presley's  arrangement with bluegrass instrumentation, neatly bridging the stylistic gap between Monroe and Presley's approaches. Bill Monroe subsequently re-recorded and performed the song using a mixture of the two styles, starting the song in its original  time arrangement, then launching into an uptempo  rendition.

Patsy Cline recorded "Blue Moon" in 1963. Cline's vocals were overdubbed over a different arrangement for the soundtrack to Cline's bio movie Sweet Dreams.

In 1968, Al Kooper recorded a version for his debut solo album I Stand Alone.

In 1969, Jerry Reed recorded a version for his album Jerry Reed Explores Guitar Country.

In 1991, Paul McCartney recorded a version for Unplugged (The Official Bootleg) which was a combination of both the Bill Monroe and Elvis Presley versions.

In 2000, John Fogerty recorded a version for a Ricky Skaggs tribute album to Bill Monroe titled Big Mon: The songs of Bill Monroe.

In 2003, the psychobilly/rockabilly band Zombie Ghost Train covered the song on their album Monster Formal Wear.

Carl Perkins was inspired by the song to move to Memphis, Tennessee where he enjoyed a more fruitful career.

The Beatles did not release a version of the song, but a track does exist of it "performed in an impromptu jam by three-quarters of the Beatles".

See also
Blue moon (disambiguation)

References

External links
Bill Monroe original version sample @ cduniverse Click on Track Listing
 Elvis version sample @ cduniverse
 Kentucky's State Bluegrass Song: Blue Moon of Kentucky
 NPR report including various versions
 Library of Congress essay on its addition to the National Recording Registry.
 - by Bill Monroe-Blue Moon Of Kentucky Single in Apple Music  

1947 songs
1954 singles
United States National Recording Registry recordings
Bluegrass songs
Bill Monroe songs
Elvis Presley songs
The Kentucky Headhunters songs
Grammy Hall of Fame Award recipients
Songs written by Bill Monroe
Columbia Records singles
Sun Records singles
RCA Victor singles
Music of Kentucky
Kentucky
Songs about Kentucky
Songs about the Moon